The 55 Timeless, also known as Xin-Yi Residential Tower, is a residential skyscraper located in Xinyi District, Taipei, Taiwan.

Design 
Designed by the American architect Richard Meier, under the requirements of preventing earthquakes and typhoons common in Taiwan, the design was based upon geometric clarity reflected in the building's structural frame organisation.  The residential building offers 43 units of apartments, with facilities including an outdoor swimming pool as well as a roof deck situated on the building's top floors, offering views of Taipei 101.

See also 
 List of tallest buildings in Taipei
 Tao Zhu Yin Yuan
 Yang Ma Tower
 Cloud Top
 Polaris Garden

References

2018 establishments in Taiwan
Residential skyscrapers in Taiwan
Skyscrapers in Taipei
Apartment buildings in Taiwan
Residential buildings completed in 2018